First-seeded Pete Sampras was the defending champion, and won the title again defeating Michael Chang in the final 6–4, 6–2.

Seeds
The top eight seeds received a bye into the second round.

Draw

Finals

Top half

Section 1

Section 2

Bottom half

Section 3

Section 4

References

External links
Draw

1994 Japan Open Tennis Championships